Atropine is the third album released by the black metal band Velvet Cacoon. It features a completely dark ambient sound.

Release history
CD Released by Full Moon limited to 1000 copies.

Track listing
All songs written by Velvet Cacoon.

Disc 1
 "Candlesmoke" - 6:24
 "Funeral Noir" - 9:35
 "Graveside Sonnet" - 12:38
 "Dreaming in a Hemlock Patch" - 36:44

Disc 2
 "Nightvines" - 3:03
 "Nocturnal Carriage" - 13:06
 "Earth and Dark Petals" - 13:02
 "Autumn Burial Victoria" - 27:55

Personnel
Velvet Cacoon - All

Velvet Cacoon albums
2005 albums
Southern Lord Records albums